Jamie Wood (born 21 September 1978) is a former professional footballer who played as a striker. He was born in Salford, England and started his career as a youth player at Manchester United. Wood has represented the Cayman Islands internationally making his debut in 2001. He last played for Welsh Premier side The New Saints where won the Welsh Premier League Title multiple times, League Cup and he also won the Welsh Cup.

In May 2011 he was released by the club after 8 years at Park Hall.

References

External links
 New Saints Profile
 

1978 births
Footballers from Salford
Living people
Caymanian footballers
Cayman Islands international footballers
English footballers
Association football forwards
Manchester United F.C. players
Royal Antwerp F.C. players
Hull City A.F.C. players
Halifax Town A.F.C. players
Swansea City A.F.C. players
The New Saints F.C. players
English Football League players
Cymru Premier players
Expatriate footballers in Belgium